Cuidado Con Las Mujeres  is a 1951 Argentine comedy film directed by Enrique Cahen Salaberry and screen written by Ariel Cortazzo based on a play by André Revesz. The film starred Otto Sirgo.

Cast
Alberto Closas
Analía Gadé
Nelly Meden
Otto Sirgo
Héctor Calcaño
Julián Bourges
Miguel Ligero
José Comellas
Mario Baroffio
Ángel Eleta
María Esther Podestá
Amalia Bernabé
Pedro Pompillo
Max Citelli
Nelly Lainez

External links
 

1951 films
1950s Spanish-language films
Bolidos
1951 comedy films
Argentine comedy films
Films directed by Enrique Cahen Salaberry
1950s Argentine films